Cecil Haig (16 March 1862 – 3 March 1947) was a British fencer. He won a silver medal in the team épée event at the 1908 Summer Olympics. He was educated at Clifton College and Gonville and Caius College, Cambridge.

References

External links
 

1862 births
1947 deaths
British male fencers
Olympic fencers of Great Britain
Fencers at the 1908 Summer Olympics
Olympic silver medallists for Great Britain
Olympic medalists in fencing
Sportspeople from Kensington
Medalists at the 1908 Summer Olympics
People educated at Clifton College
20th-century British people